St. Paul High School is a public high school in St. Paul, Oregon, United States.

Academics
In 2008, 83% of the school's seniors received a high school diploma. Of 18 students, 15 graduated and three dropped out.

References

High schools in Marion County, Oregon
Public middle schools in Oregon
Public high schools in Oregon